John Tamanika (born 15 November 1984) is a rugby football player who currently plays rugby union for Randwick in the Shute Shield. He formerly played rugby league professionally in the National Rugby League at the South Sydney Rabbitohs.

Career
Tamanika played for the Otahuhu Leopards in the Auckland Rugby League between 1997 and 2002. He first played senior football for Victoria University of Wellington before playing in the Bartercard Cup for Wellington. Tamanika then moved to Central Queensland where he played for Central Queensland University and then the Central Queensland Comets at State Level. Tamanika played for Eastern Suburbs Tigers in the Queensland Cup in 2006 and 2007. In 2007 he was the Queensland Cup leading try scorer.

He was chosen for the Tonga training squad for the 2008 World Cup but was not selected in the final squad.

Personal life
Tamanika is the first cousin of former All Blacks Legend Jonah Tali Lomu and first cousin of Tongan rugby international Seti Kiole. Tamanika's mother (Mele Leamahi) Jonah Lomu's mother (Hepisipa) and Seti Kiole's father (Peni) are all siblings.

References

External links 
Easts Tigers profile

1984 births
Living people
Central Queensland Capras players
Eastern Suburbs Tigers players
New Zealand rugby league players
New Zealand rugby union players
New Zealand sportspeople of Tongan descent
North Sydney Bears NSW Cup players
Otahuhu Leopards players
Rugby league centres
Rugby league players from Auckland
Rugby league wingers
Rugby union players from Auckland
South Sydney Rabbitohs players
Wellington rugby league team players